Hutchinson is an unincorporated community in Baker County, Oregon, United States.

Hutchinson was a station on the route of the Union Pacific Railroad's Huntington subdivision named for a local family. The line was originally owned by the Oregon Railroad and Navigation Company. Hutchinson post office was founded in 1900 with James H. Hutchinson as the first postmaster. The post office closed in 1902.

References

External links
Images of Hutchinson from Flickr

Unincorporated communities in Baker County, Oregon
Unincorporated communities in Oregon